John Umfray (died 1409 or after), of Canterbury, Kent, was an English politician and draper.

Career
Umfray was a Member of Parliament for Canterbury, Kent in October 1404.

References

People from Canterbury
English MPs October 1404
14th-century births
15th-century deaths
Year of birth unknown
Year of death missing